Mount Sparrowhawk is a  mountain summit located in Kananaskis Country in the Canadian Rockies of Alberta, Canada. Mount Sparrowhawk's nearest higher peak is Mount Bogart,  to the southeast. Sparrowhawk's south slope was a candidate to be used as a ski hill for the alpine events at the 1988 Winter Olympics, but nearby Mount Allan's Nakiska was selected instead.

History

The first ascent of the peak was made in 1947 by R.C. Hind, L. Parker, Mr. and Mrs. H.H. Rans.

Mount Shark and Mount Sparrowhawk were designated as sites to host alpine skiing events in Calgary's bid for the 1988 Winter Olympics, however, the venue for the alpine skiing events moved to Nakiska shortly after Calgary was awarded the Games.

Geology

Mount Sparrowhawk is composed of sedimentary rock laid down during the Precambrian to Jurassic periods. Formed in shallow seas, this sedimentary rock was pushed east and over the top of younger rock during the Laramide orogeny.

Climate

Based on the Köppen climate classification, Mount Sparrowhawk is located in a subarctic climate zone with cold, snowy winters, and mild summers. Winter temperatures can drop below  with wind chill factors below . Precipitation runoff from the mountain drains east into the Kananaskis River and west into Spray Lakes Reservoir, both of which empty to the Bow River.

See also
 Mountains of Alberta
 Geography of Alberta

References

External links
 Mount Sparrowhawk weather: Mountain Forecast

Sparrowhawk
Sparrowhawk
Sparrowhawk